Annemarie and Her Cavalryman is a 1926 German silent film directed by Erich Eriksen and starring Colette Brettel, Sig Arno, and Hans Junkermann.

The film's sets were designed by Karl Machus.

Cast

References

Bibliography

External links

1926 films
Films of the Weimar Republic
German silent feature films
Films directed by Erich Eriksen
German black-and-white films